Yehia Dessouki (Arabic: يحيى دسوقى; born 13 March 1978) is an Egyptian painter and visual artist making  contemporary art using diverse kinds of media both traditional and digital. He is also an architect, who graduated from the faculty of fine-arts, architecture department, of Helwan University. He has participated in many group exhibitions showing several art works featuring different themes, such as: Architecture of Old Islamic Cairo - Still Life - Lanterns of Ramadan Fawanees -  Circus, and later on he made his first solo exhibition about "Joy of Roses" including soft pastel sketches and also oil paintings.

Artist Yehia Dessouki has a distinguished style, remarkable for his use of vivid and rich colorful palettes in most of his art-works.

Being raised among an artistic family was an early dominant influence on his art life. His father is the Batik artist Ali Dessouki and his mother was an art critic and lawyer. More influence came along with his summer study trip to Italy (Società Dante Alighieri), giving him a golden chance to visit art museums in Rome, Milan, Florence and Pisa and most importantly, visiting Venice Biennial of Plastic Arts.

Thanks to his passion for digital graphics, he made some diverse experimental digital art works specially in digital painting showing an innovative art theme which mixes between Marionettes of theater and Arabic calligraphy. One of those digital-paintings was the first digital painting art work ever to be published on the cover of a formal Egyptian newspaper Akhbar Al-Adab, which is a famous weekly Egyptian newspaper read by Egyptian cultural elite.

Biography 
 Born in Cairo on 13 March 1978.
 He has graduated from the faculty of Fine-Arts, Architecture department, Helwan university followed by Pre-master's degree studies, Faculty of Fine-Arts 2002.
 Member of "Engineers" syndicate in Egypt.
 Member of "Plastic artists" syndicate in Egypt.
 Member of Art Society "Ghouri artists".
 Member of the art-group "El Lakta El Wahda".

Exhibitions 
 Local Exhibitions
Group exhibitions including yearly college student exhibits, Pioneers society "al talae3" and private galleries' exhibitions in gallery Shomoa, Cairo Opera house gallery, gallery Salama,  gallery Picasso, gallery Droob, gallery Saqiet el Sawy and finally gallery of Egyptian Artists' syndicate.
Seven group-exhibitions with members of the art society  "Ghouri Artists".
Five group-exhibitions with the art-group "El Lakta El Wahda" .
Solo Shows
Joy of roses at gallery Cordoba on 8 March 2009, Cairo, Egypt.

Awards 
National awards
First Prize in "Drawing" from Society of Art-lovers, headed by famous pioneer artist Salah Taher.
International awards
First Prize in "Digital Photography" from Al-Arabi (magazine) by Kuwait 2009.
Prize of summer study prize trip to Italy, Società Dante Alighieri, Roma, Italy.

Collections 
 State collections
Egyptian Museum of Modern Art "Ministry of Culture's Acquisition".
Private Collections
Special groups of persons in Egypt and abroad
Picasso Gallery
Grant Gallery
Droub Gallery
Salama Gallery

Important works of art in the life of the artist 

"Ancient Islamic Cairo" Ink drawings

"Still-life" oil painting

"Joy of Roses" soft-pastel

"Marionettes of Theater & Arabic Calligraphy" Digital Painting

See also 
Al-Arabi Magazine by Kuwait
Batik
Islamic Cairo
Contemporary art
Società Dante Alighieri
Cairo Opera House
Akhbar el-Adab

Notes

References 
Foundations

Society of Art-lovers
Faculty of Fine Arts – Helwan University
Egyptian syndicate of plastic artists
Egyptian syndicate of engineers
Egyptian Museum of Modern Art
Cairo Opera House
Wikalet Al ghoury
Picasso art gallery Egypt
Akhbar el adab newspaper
Al Ahram newspaper
Al-Arabi Magazine in Kuwait

Individuals 

Ezz El Din Naguib (2009) Al Hewar Al Jadeed' Newspaper   - 1 May 2009" – issue No. 2.
Rania El Damasy (2009)  Al Ahram Newspaper   - 19 March 2009 – issue No. 44663.
Ali Dessouki : Batik artist.

External links 
Yehia Dessouki ' Fan Page
Book "Yehia Dessouki .. a visual-artist at mid-road of art "
Article about paintings of Yehia Dessouki  featuring his exhibition "Joy of Roses" published in "aljarida" newspaper
Article about paintings of Yehia Dessouki featuring his exhibition "Joy of Roses" published in "alomah" newspaper
Article about paintings of Yehia Dessouki  featuring his exhibition "Joy of Roses" published in "lahona" women's magazine

1978 births
Living people
Egyptian painters
Artists from Cairo
Helwan University alumni
Egyptian contemporary artists